Melyssa Ade (born November 7, 1976) is a Canadian actress.

Born in Yellowknife, Northwest Territories, she moved as a child with her family to Toronto and later studied acting at Earl Haig Secondary School and at HB Studio in New York. After mainly appearing in television roles, Ade moved into movies with the role of Janessa in Jason X. She also appeared in several Toronto stage productions, most notably in The Teenage Girl Diaries, for which she was nominated for a 2003 Dora Mavor Moore Award.

Filmography

Film

Television

Awards and nominations

References

External links

1976 births
Actresses from the Northwest Territories
Canadian film actresses
Canadian television actresses
Living people
People from Yellowknife